Zang Molk (also known as Zangamurt, Zang Murt, and Zank Molk) is a village in Azghan Rural District, in the Central District of Ahar County, East Azerbaijan Province, Iran. At the 2006 census, its population was 17, in 6 families.

References 

Populated places in Ahar County